FC Budăi  was a Moldovan football club based in Budăi, Telenești, Moldova. They played in the Divizia A, the second tier of Moldovan football.

Achievements
Divizia B
Winners (1): 2013–14

External links
FC Budăi on Soccerway.com

Football clubs in Moldova
Association football clubs established in 2013
FC Budai
Association football clubs disestablished in 2015
Defunct football clubs in Moldova